Mattia Bottani (born 24 May 1991) is a Swiss professional footballer who plays as a left midfielder for Swiss Super League club Lugano and the Switzerland national team.

Career
On 15 May 2022, Bottani scored a goal in Lugano's 4–1 victory over St. Gallen in the final of the Swiss Cup. In 2016, during the final of the Swiss Cup against FC Zurich, on the 0-0, he missed a penalty who would allow the club to win the competition (final result: 1-0 for FC Zurich).

Honours
Lugano
Swiss Cup: 2021–22

References

External links

1991 births
Living people
Sportspeople from Lugano
Association football midfielders
Swiss men's footballers
Swiss Super League players
Swiss Challenge League players
FC Lugano players
Genoa C.F.C. players
FC Wil players